Gregory Ralph Evigan (born October 14, 1953) is an American film, stage, and television actor. He began his career in theater, appearing in the Broadway production of Jesus Christ Superstar, followed by a stage production of the musical Grease, in which he portrayed the lead, Danny Zuko. Evigan made his feature film debut in Scorchy (1976), then was cast as the lead in the comedy series B. J. and the Bear, in which he starred between 1979 and 1981.

Evigan continued to appear as a guest star on numerous television series throughout the 1980s before being cast as the lead Joey Harris in the comedy series My Two Dads (1987–1990). He later appeared on the science fiction series TekWar (1995–1996), and had guest-starring roles on Melrose Place (1996–1997) and 7th Heaven (1997). He subsequently had starring roles on the soap opera Pacific Palisades (also 1997), and portrayed a record executive in the Canadian series Big Sound from 2001 to 2002. 

Evigan's other film credits include the Joey Travolta-directed drama films Mel (1998) and Arizona Summer (2004), the Western film 6 Guns (2010), and the Hallmark Channel film Once Upon a Holiday (2015). In 2018, he guest-starred in a multi-episode arc as Jim Harvey on the soap opera General Hospital.

Early years
Evigan was born October 14, 1953 in South Amboy, New Jersey, the son of Ralph Milan Evigan, an electrician, and his wife, Barbara Elizabeth Evigan, a homemaker. Beginning at age 8, Evigan was classically trained on piano, and went on to play the organ and saxophone. As a teenager, he played in several rock bands. Evigan grew up in Sayreville, New Jersey, and attended Sayreville War Memorial High School, graduating in 1971. In 2007 he was inducted into the school's Alumni Hall of Fame for his contributions to the arts.

Career
Evigan began his career after graduating high school, appearing in a small role as Annas in the Broadway production of Jesus Christ Superstar in 1971, as well as the touring production.  Between 1972 and 1973, he starred as Danny Zuko in the Broadway production of Grease, reprising the role for the show's residency in Chicago, alongside Marilu Henner. Evigan moved to Los Angeles and was cast in his feature film debut in the exploitation film Scorchy (1976), starring Connie Stevens.

In 1978, he was cast as Billie Joe "B.J." McKay, a truck driver whose best friend was a chimpanzee named Bear, in the series B.J. and the Bear. Following the series' conclusion in 1981, Evigan continued to work in television, with recurring guest roles on Masquerade (1984) and Murder, She Wrote (1986), then was cast in the comedy series My Two Dads (1987–1990), in which he portrayed a man who co-parents the daughter of his deceased girlfriend alongside her ex-boyfriend.

In 1989, he starred in the sci-fi film DeepStar Six, and later appeared in the sci-fi series TekWar opposite William Shatner, based on a series of books by Shatner. TekWar originated as a series of two-hour television movies in 1994, and then became a series of hour-long episodes that ran in 1995 and 1996. Between 1996 and 1997, Evigan guest-starred as Dr. Dan Hathaway on the soap opera Melrose Place, followed by a main role on Pacific Palisades, in which he portrayed one of several friends who relocate from the Midwest to California. Evigan had a lead role in Joey Travolta's directorial debut, the drama Mel (1998). In 2001, he starred in the psychological thriller film Spirit opposite Elisabeth Moss, playing the father of a teenage girl who believes their home is haunted. He reunited with director Joey Travolta, appearing in his family drama Arizona Summer (2004), followed by a supporting part in River's End (2005). Evigan returned to theater in 2008, appearing as Gar in a stage adaptation of Mask at the Pasadena Playhouse. In Britain, Evigan is especially well known for the humorous and educational film clips under the name of When Insects Attack, which he fronted and were shown as part of BBC schools programming in the 1990s.

In 2015, Evigan had a supporting role in the Hallmark Channel film Once Upon a Holiday, co-starring his daughter Briana. He had a guest-starring role on the network crime series Bones in 2017, followed by a multi-episode character arc as Jim Harvey on General Hospital in 2018.

Personal life
On June 3, 1979, Evigan married dancer Pamela C. Serpe. The couple has three children. Their daughters, Briana (born 1986) and Vanessa (born 1981) are actresses, while their son Jason (born 1983) is a musician and former frontman of a Los Angeles-based band After Midnight Project.

Filmography

Film

Television

Stage credits

References

External links

 

 
 

1953 births
American male film actors
American male stage actors
American male musical theatre actors
American male television actors
Living people
Male actors from New Jersey
People from Sayreville, New Jersey
People from South Amboy, New Jersey
Sayreville War Memorial High School alumni